The 1973 Merseyside County Council election took place on 12 April 1973 to elect members of Merseyside County Council in England. This was on the same day as other local elections.

There were 95 wards electing the 99 members between them. Two wards, (both in Wirral), were uncontested.

Election results

Overall election result

New Council.

Results by borough

Knowsley borough

Turnout: 31.5%

Liverpool borough

Turnout: 34.4%

Sefton borough

Turnout: 40.0%

St Helens borough

Turnout: 34.4%

Wirral borough

Turnout: 41.1%

Ward results

Knowsley

Huyton With Roby No. 1 (Huyton Farm-Princess-Woolfall)

Huyton With Roby No. 2 (Longview and Rupert Farm)

Huyton With Roby No. 3 (St Agnes-St Bartholomews-Swanside)

Huyton With Roby No. 4 (St Gabriels and St Michaels)

Kirkby No. 1 (Central and Minstead)

Kirkby No. 2 (Cherryfield and Whitfield)

Kirkby No. 3 (Northwood-Park-Tower Hill-Simonswood)

Prescot

Whiston No. 1 (Croton-Tarbock-Whiston)

Whiston No. 3 (Halewood)

Whiston No. 4 (Knowsley)

Liverpool

Liverpool No. 1 (Abercromby and St James)

Liverpool No. 2 (Aigburth)

Liverpool No. 3 (Allerton)

Liverpool No. 4 (Anfield)

Liverpool No. 5 (Arundel)

Liverpool No. 6 (Breckfield and St Domingo)

Liverpool No. 7 (Broadgreen)

Liverpool No. 8 (Central Everton and Netherfield)

Liverpool No. 9 (Childwall)

Liverpool No. 10 (Church)

Liverpool No. 11 (Clubmoor)

Liverpool No. 12 (County)

Liverpool No. 13 (Croxteth)

Liverpool No. 14 (Dingle)

Liverpool No. 15 (Dovecot)

Liverpool No. 16 (Fairfield)

Liverpool No. 17 (Fazakerley)

Liverpool No. 18 (Gillmoss)

Liverpool No. 19 (Granby and Princes Park)

Liverpool No. 20 (Kensington)

Liverpool No. 21 (Low Hill and Smithdown)

Liverpool No. 22 (Melrose and Westminster)

Liverpool No. 23 (Old Swan)

Liverpool No. 24 (Picton)

Liverpool No. 25 (Pirrie)

Liverpool No. 26 (St Marys)

Liverpool No. 27 (St Michaels)

Liverpool No. 28 (Sandhills and Vauxhall)

Liverpool No. 29 (Speke)

Liverpool No. 30 (Tuebrook)

Liverpool No. 31 (Warbreck)

Liverpool No. 32 (Woolton East)

Liverpool No. 33 (Woolton West)

Sefton

Bootle No. 1

Bootle No. 2 (Linacre and Mersey)

Bootle No. 3 (Netherton-Orrell-Sefton)

Crosby No. 1 (Central-College-St Johns)

Crosby No. 2 (Christchurch-St Marys-St Thomas)

Crosby No. 3 (East)

Crosby No. 4 (North and West)

Formby

Litherland

Southport No. 1 (Ainsdale-Birkdale South)

Southport No. 2 (Birkdale East-Birkdale North-South)

Southport No. 3 (Central-Birkdale West-West)

Southport No. 4 (Craven-Sussex-Talbot)

Southport No. 5 (Hesketh and Scarisbrick)

Southport No. 6 (Marine and Park)

West Lancashire No. 1 (Aintree)

West Lancashire No. 2 (Maghull East and North-Melling)

West Lancashire No. 3 (Maghull South & West-Melling)

St Helens

Haydock

Newton-Le-Willows

Rainford

St. Helens No. 1 (Central and South Eccleston)

St. Helens No. 2 (East Sutton)

St. Helens No. 3 (Hardshaw and West Sutton)

St. Helens No. 4 (Moss Bank and North Windle)

St. Helens No. 5 (North Eccleston and South Windle)

St. Helens No. 6 (Parr)

Whiston No. 2 (Eccleston and Windle)

Whiston No. 5 (Rainhill and Bold)

Wirral

Bebington No. 1 (Higher Bebington and Woodhey)

Bebington No. 2 (Park-New Ferry-North Bromborough)

Bebington No. 3 (South Bromborough and Eastham)

Bebington No. 4 (Lower Bebington and Poulton)

Birkenhead No. 1 (Argyle-Clifton-Holt)

Birkenhead No. 2 (Bebington and Mersey)

Birkenhead No. 3 (Cathcart-Claughton-Cleveland)

Birkenhead No. 4 (Devonshire and Egerton)

Birkenhead No. 5 (Gilbrook and St James)

Birkenhead No. 6 (Grange and Oxton)

Birkenhead No. 7 (Prenton)

Birkenhead No. 8 (Upton)

Hoylake No. 1 (Caldy and Frankby)

Hoylake No. 2 (Central-Hoose-Meols-Park)

Wallasey No. 1 (Leasowe)

Wallasey No. 2 (Marlowe-Egremont-South Liscard)

Wallasey No. 3 (Moreton and Saughall Massie)

Wallasey No. 4 (New Brighton-Wallasey-Warren)

Wallasey No. 5 (North Liscard-Upper Brighton St.)

Wallasey No. 6 (Seacombe-Poulton-Somerville)

Wirral No. 1 (Barnston-Gayton-Heswall-Oldfield)

Wirral No. 2 (Irby-Pensby-Thurstaston)

Notes

• bold denotes the winning candidate

References

1973
1973 English local elections
1970s in Merseyside